This is a list of films shown at the Rhode Island International Horror Film Festival (RIIHFF). The RIIHFF, described by Diabolique Magazine as "one of the top horror film festivals in the world", is the largest and longest-running horror film festival in New England. A jury chooses the festival's official selections to highlight leading horror films from around the world and to draw the public's interest to the New England film industry.
The festival typically receives hundreds of submissions each year, from which only a handful are chosen. The 2012 Rhode Island International Horror Film Festival selected 63 films out of 461 submissions from 20 countries.

Multiple films have made their U.S. or international premieres at the RIIHFF. In 2004, six festival entries made their U.S. premiere, and five made their world premiere. Other films premiering at the festival have included: Dark Remains (2005), Day X (2005), Pretty Dead Things (2006), Sea of Dust (2008), Chloe and Attie (2009), and Sudden Death! (2010).

A number of films are accepted into the festival as non-competition entries. In its early years, the RIIHFF screened formerly lost and restored films, most often silent films with live accompaniment, at the historic Columbus Theatre. These have included Tales of the Uncanny (1919), Der Golem (1920), Nosferatu (1922), and The Phantom of the Opera (1925). In 2010, the festival offered a special world premiere screening of a restored, high definition version of Roger Corman's The Fall of the House of Usher (1960). The festival has also showcased cult and foreign horror films. From 2003 to 2004, the festival featured the "Japanese Horror Film Showcase", from which Shunsuke Yamamoto's The Strange Killers won the Viola M. Marshall Audience Choice Award. The 2006 screening of Day of the Dead was attended by cast member Gary Howard Klar. In addition, exclusive film screenings have included All the Love You Cannes! and Citizen Toxie: The Toxic Avenger Part IV in 2002, with director Lloyd Kaufman in attendance for the latter film, and Scream 4 in 2011.

2000

2001 

The festival took place between October 26 and October 28, 2001 at the Columbus Theater in Providence, Rhode Island. It selected a total of 14 films including one non-competition entry.

Feature competition 
Cradle of Fear (Alex Chandon)
Terror Tract (Clint Hutchinson and Lance W. Dreesen) – Best Feature

Non–competition features
The Phantom of the Opera (Rupert Julian, 1925)

Shorts
Dead In America (Lawrence Klein)
Digging Ashley (Todd Cobery) – Best Short
The Fragile Skin (John Carr)
Teacher of the Year (Brian Adler)
Thou Shalt Not Kill (Yuk Ting Chan)
Tomorrow's Bacon (Bryan Norton) – H.P. Lovecraft Award
Twitch (Daniel Giambruno)
Vampire Hunter's Club (Donald F. Glut)
Veil (B. Mark Seabrooks)

Source:

2002 

The festival took place between October 25 and October 27, 2002 at the Columbus Theater in Providence, Rhode Island. It selected a total of 23 films including 4 non-competition entries. The event drew record attendance for the historic theater which was then celebrating its 75th year in operation.
Feature competition 
Anacardium (Scott Thomas)
The Human BEEing (Tony Shea)
Tomorrow by Midnight (Rolfe Kanefsky) – Best Feature; East Coast premiere.

Documentaries
All the Love You Cannes! (Lloyd Kaufman)

Non–competition features
Nosferatu (F. W. Murnau, 1922)
Robotrix (Jamie Luk Kim Ming, 1991)
Riki-Oh: The Story of Ricky (Nam Nai Choi, 1991)
Citizen Toxie (Lloyd Kaufman, 2000)

Shorts
Abaddon (Pamela Theodotou)
Anna's Room (Patrick Boyton)
Copycat (Christian Davis)
Daughter (Eduardo Rodriguez)
Desert People
A Final Wish (Ose Oyamendan)
First Night Shift (Hubert Cheng)
Little Ricky (Michael Condro)
Marcilla (Jenelle Troxell)
Monkey Trap (Greg Nunes)
Off (Tyler Polhemus) – (tie) Best Short
Separation Anxiety (Guido Santi)
Surface Calm (Mike Miley)
The Snowman (Rene Dupre and Jim Lindstedt)
The Terror of the Invisible Man (Adam Roffman and Wayne Kimball)
Timmy's Wish (Patrick Cannon) – (tie) Best Short

Source:

2003 

The festival took place between October 23 and October 26, 2003 at the Columbus Theater in Providence, Rhode Island. It selected a total of 18 films including 4 non-competition entries.

Feature competition 
Blood of the Beast (Georg Koszulinski) – Best Director
The Curse of Welwitschia (Adalberto Fornario) – New England premiere.
Flesh for the Beast (Terry West)
Ghost of the Needle (Brian Avenet-Bradley) – Best Feature
King of the Ants (Stuart Gordon) – East Coast premiere.

Documentaries
Ghost and Vampire Legends of Rhode Island (Scott Saracen and Maria Patsias)

Non–competition features
Der Golem (Carl Boese and Paul Wegener, 1920)
Maniac (William Lustig, 1980)
Zombi (Lucio Fulci, 1979)
Best of the Fest
The Human BEEing (Tony Shea) – 2002 entry
Little Ricky (Michael Condro) – 2002 entry
Timmy's Wish (Patrick Cannon) – 2002 Best Short
Japanese Horror Film Showcase
Ichi the Killer (Takashi Miike, 2001)
Uzumaki (Higuchinsky, 2000)

Shorts
Deja Vu (Nossah Kirt)
Einstein's Brain (Ben Sweeney)
Filthy (Andy Lalaino) – (tie) Best Short
Headhunter (Adam Alleca) – Best Special Effects
The Legend of Aerreus Kane (Lance Maurer)
Red's Breakfast Experience (Caleb Emerson)
Red's Breakfast
Red's Breakfast 2: Dawn of the Red
Red's Breakfast 3: Die You Zombie Bastards!
William Wilson (Nicholas Davis) – (tie) Best Short

Source:

2004 

The festival took place between October 14 and October 17, 2004 at the Columbus Theater in Providence, Rhode Island. It received 243 official entries, and 12 non-competition films, from 5 countries and 14 U.S. states, of which 27 were selected.
Feature competition 
Freak Out (Christian James) – (tie) Best Genre Cross Over
Shelf Life (Mark Tuit)

Documentaries
The Vampire Hunters (Tim Hopewell) – U.S. premiere

Non–competition features
Tales of the Uncanny (Richard Oswald, 1919)
Brief Lessons in the History of Rhode Island (Anthony Penta)
Lesson 1: The Pirate Queen
Lesson 2: The Werewolf of Pawtucket
Japanese Horror Film Showcase
Alive (Ryuhei Kitamura, 2002)
Eko Eko Azarak: Wizard of Darkness (Shimako Sato, 1995)
The Strange Killers (Shunsuke Yamamoto, 2002) – 2004 Viola M. Marshall Audience Choice Award

Shorts
A Reasonable Hypothesis (Jack Ferry)
Art of the Dead (Brian Purviance)
The Crypt Club (Miguel Gallego) – (tie) Best Short
Cube Zero (Ernie Barbarash) – Best Visual Effects
Dead & Breakfast (Matthew Leutwyler) – Best Feature
Detained (Jason Tammemagi)
Disfrasada (Mauro Rubeo)
Enter...Zombie King (Stacey Case)
Graveyard Alive (Elza Kephart) – (tie) Best Genre Cross Over
Hokus Fokus (Brian Edgens)
The Last Horror Movie (Julian Richards) – Best Director
London Voodoo (Robert Pratten)
The People (Michael Noonan)
Ring of Blood (Kenny Barrickman)
Un–Real (Paul Natale)
Thanatos Road (Edward Kishel)
There's Something Out There (Brian Pulido) – (tie) Best Short
3 a.m. (Stewart Hopewell)
Zymosis (Daniel-James Matrundola)

Source:

2005 

The festival took place between October 27 and October 30, 2005. It received over 120 submissions, of which 28 films were selected. The festival was held at multiple venues for the first time and included Cable Car Cinema, Columbus Theatre, and Providence Chamber of Commerce Theatre in Providence, and the Courthouse Center for the Arts in West Kingston, Rhode Island.

Feature competition
All Cheerleaders Must Die (Lucky McKee and Chris Sivertson)
August Underground (Fred Vogel) – Vanguard Award
Cruel World (Kelsey T. Howard) – Horror Excellence Award; East Coast premiere.
Dark Remains (Brian Avenet-Bradley) – Best Feature
Day X (Jason Hack) – Best Director
The Experiment (Daniel Turner)
Hellbent (Paul Etheredge-Ouzts) – Vanguard Award
Izo (Takashi Miike)
The Mangler Reborn (Matt Cunningham and Erik Gardner)
The Manson Family (Jim Van Bebber)
Shadow: Dead Riot (Derek Wan)
Zombie Honeymoon (David Gebroe)

Non–competition features
Henry: Portrait of a Serial Killer (John McNaughton, 1986)
The Texas Chain Saw Massacre (Tobe Hooper, 1974)

Shorts
Beaster (Vincent Morrone)
Blood Jacker
Bloody Mary (J. Elizabeth Martin)
Facility 4 (Colter Freeman)
Gotham Cafe (Jack Edward Sawyers)
Home Delivery
Means to an End (Paul Solet) – Best Short
Mom vs. The Undead (James Darling)
Nothing in the Dark (John Correll, Jr.)
Rats (David Brocca)
The Road Virus Heads North (David Brock)
School of the Dead (James Raymond)
Snow Day, Bloody Snow Day (Jessica Baxter and Faye Hoerauf)
The Tell Tale Heart (Raul Garcia) – Best Animated
Voices Within (Christopher Vallone)
We All Fall Down (Jake Kennedy) – Best Special Effects
The White Mice (Luke Taylor)
Zombie Movie (Michael J. Asquith)
Black Cab Films Shorts
Human No More (Christopher Alan Broadstone)
Marburg (Shannon Lark)
Moondance (Will Bigham)
My Skin! (Christopher Alan Broadstone)

Source:

2006 

The festival took place between October 5 and October 8, 2006. It received over 150 submissions, from which 40 films were selected. The festival venues included Cable Car Theatre, Columbus Theatre, and URI Feinstein Campus in Providence, Rhode Island.

Feature competition 
Bone Sickness (Brian Paulin) – Best Makeup FX
Die You Zombie Bastards! (Caleb Emerson) – Best New England
The Entrance (Damon Vignale)
The Lost (Chris Sivertson)
Ricky 6 (Peter Filardi, /)
Seepage (Richard Griffin) – Best Genre Cross Over
The Slaughter (Jay Lee) – Best Feature
Unrest (Jason Todd Ipson)

Documentaries
Horror Business (Christopher P. Garetano)

Non–competition features
Day of the Dead (George Romero, 1985)

Shorts
All I Want For Christmas (Scott Goldberg)
The Beach (Matthew Harrington)
Bed Bugs (Sean Carley) – North American premiere
Blood Son (Michael McGruther)
The Boarder (Susan Bell)
Breezehaven (Patrick Bosworth and Jamie Dufault)
Call of Cthulhu (Andrew Leman)
Camp Blood: The Musical (Tanner Barklow, Jefferson Craig and Thomas Hughes) – Audience Award
Can I Call You (Edward "Ed" Lyons)
The Day They Came Back (Scott Goldberg) – Best New Director
Eating Razors (Ron Decaro)
Eddie Loves You (Karl Holt)
The Eyes of Edward James (Rodrigo Gudino)
Grace (Paul Solet) – Best Short
The Incredible Falling Apart Man (Kenneth Hurd)
It's Just a Dream (Luke Cote)
Legion: Word Made Flesh (Robert Sexton)
The Listening Dead (Phil Mucci)
Man of the Worm (Brad Eadie)
Midnight Screening (Annabel Osborne)
The Need (Chris Young)
Nightmare (Scott Goldberg)
Oculus (Mike Flanagan)
Of Darkness (Gary E. Irvin)
Penny Dreadful (Bryan Norton)
The Pit and the Pendulum (Marc Lougee)
Teddy Scares (William Vaughan)
The Terrorist Ate My Brain (Brett Young)
Unexpected Company (Justin Sulham)
The White Lie (Ron Decaro)
Witchwise (Joe Harris)
Zombie Prom (Vince Marcello)

Source:

2007 

The festival took place between October 18 and October 21, 2007. It received over 175 submissions, of which 43 films were selected. The festival venues included the Bell Street Chapel Theatre, Brooklyn Coffee and Tea House, Cable Car Theatre, Columbus Theatre, Providence Public Library, and URI Feinstein Campus in Providence and the Narragansett Theatre in Narragansett, Rhode Island.

Feature competition 
Am I Evil (Richard Terrasi) – Best New Director
Apartment 1303 (Ataru Oikawa)
Bacterium (Brett Piper)
Brain Dead (Kevin S. Tenney) – Best Feature
Chill (Serge Rodnunsky)
Cthulhu (Daniel Gildark)
Days of Darkness (Jake Kennedy)
Easter Bunny, Kill! Kill! (Chad Ferrin)
A Feast of Flesh (Mike Watt)
The Gateway Meat (Ron DeCaro)
Gay Bed & Breakfast of Terror (Jaymes Thompson)
Netherbeast Incorporated (Dean Ronalds)
August Underground's Penance (Fred Vogel) – Best Makeup FX
Pretty Dead Things (Richard Griffin)
The Terror Factor (Gary Medeiros) – Best New England

Documentaries
Kreating Karloff (Connor Timmis)
Vampira: The Movie (Kevin Sean Michaels)

Shorts
Anesthesia (Adam Kargman)
Bad Dreams (Fansu Njie)
Beanbag (Jim Mitchell)
By Appointment Only (John Faust)
Chickenfut (Harrison Witt)
The Demonology of Desire (Rodrigo Gudino) – Best Short
Die Flugbegleiterin  (Marcin Glowacki)
The Door (Jeffrey Frame)
Family Portrait (Anthony Colliano)
Franklin (Michael Cimpher)
Gay Zombie (Michael Simon)
Gruesome (Greg Lamberson) 
A Homecoming (Kelly Farrel)
Human Resources (Jonathan Vantulleken)
It's My Birthday (Shannon Lark)
Keeper of the Myth (Kevin Callies)
Mr. Bubbs (Todd Thompson)
Mr. Video (Alex Masterton)
Night of the Hell Hamsters (Paul Campion)
Sinning Flesh, a Bedtime Story (Dave Borges)
Still Breathing (Yusaku Mizoguchi)
The Vial (Brad Rego)
Voodoo Bayou (Javier Gutierrez)
W.O.R.M. (Anthony Sumner)
A Writer's Moon (Alex Baptista)
ZombieWestern: It Came From The West (Tor Fruergaard)

Source:

2008 

The festival took place between October 23 and October 26, 2008. It received over 250 submissions, of which 47 films were selected. The festival venues included the Bell Street Chapel Theatre, Cable Car Theatre, Columbus Theatre, and Providence Public Library in Providence and the Narragansett Theatre in Narragansett, Rhode Island.

Feature competition
Blackspot (Ben Hawker)
Christian Vampires from Beyond Suburbia (Jacquie Schnabel)
Conjurer (Clint Hutchison) – Directorial Discovery
Epitaph (Jung Brothers) – (tie) Best Feature
Exte: Hair Extensions (Sion Sono)
The Living and the Dead (Simon Rumley)
Nightlife (Tim Sanderson) 
Sea of Dust (Scott Bunt)  – (tie) Best Feature; world premiere.
Trailer Park of Terror (Steven Goldmann)

Documentaries
Spine Tingler! The William Castle Story (Jeffrey Schwarz) – Best Documentary

Shorts
Advantage (Sean Byrne)
A Hood in the Woods (Michael Kennedy)
AM 1200 (David Prior) – Best Short
aQua ad lavandum – in brevi (Florian Metzner)
At Night (Max Landes)
Awakened (Dale Stewart)
Bendito el fruto de tu vientre (Sara Seligman)
Breast Pump and Blender (Elizabeth Gorcey)
The Call of Cthulhu (Andrew Leman)
Cheerbleeders (Peter Podgursky)
The Curse of Micah Rood (Alec Asten) – Best New England
Dead West (Eli Joseph Sasich)
Death in Charge (Devi Snively)
Detour (K. Akeseh Tsakpo)
Eel Girl (Paul Campion) – Best Makeup FX
Ergotism (Stefan Rochfort)
The Facts in the Case of Mister Hollow (Rodrigo Gudino)
Family Affair (Rafael de Leon, Jr.)
Fright Site (Bill Timoney)
Harvest Moon (Micah Ranum)
Hugo (Nicholas Verso)
In Twilight's Shadow (T.M. Scorzafava)
Kirksdale (Ryan Spindell) – Best Student Film
Last Night (Ed Park)
Mirror, Mirror (Valerie Champagne)
Next Floor (Denis Villeneuve)
Pickman's Model (Gary Fierro)
Psycho Hillbilly Cabin Massacre (Robert Cosnahan)
Pumpkin Hell (Max Finneran)
Sebastian's Voodoo (Joaquin Baldwin)
Snip (Julien Zenier, /)
Soulmates (Tom Flynn)
This Way Up (Adam Foulkes and Alan Smith)
Vanished Acres (Adam Bolt)
Víctor y la máquina  (Carlos Talamanca)
Voigtkampff (Tobias Suhm)
Von Hasen und Schnitzeln  (Thorsten Wassermeyer)

Source:

2009 

The festival took place between October 22 and October 25, 2009. It received over 250 submissions, of which 37 films were selected. The festival venues included the Bell Street Chapel Theatre and Providence Public Library in Providence, Rhode Island.

Feature competition 
Bikini Girls on Ice (Geoff Klein)
Circuit (Andrew Landauro) – (tie) Best Feature
Cornered! (Daniel Maze) – (tie) First Place for Best Feature
Dawning (Gregg Holtgrewe) – (tie) Best Feature
The Disappeared (Johnny Kevorkian)

Documentaries
Nightmares in Red, White and Blue (Andrew Monument) – Best Documentary

Shorts
The Babysitter (Kristen Gray)
Back to Life (Mike Salva)
Broom Ride to Salem (Amybeth Parravano)
Celeriac (John D. Reilly)
Corrections (Bob Franklin)
Crooked Lane (Chase Bailey) – Best New England
Danse Macabre (Pedro Pires)
The Devil's Wedding (Dan Cadan)
Excision (Richard Bates)
First Kill (Micah Ranum)
Happy Face (Franklin P. Laviola) – Directorial Discovery
Hector Corp (Gary Lee)
How My Dad Killed Dracula (Sky Soleil)
Il Diavolo (Andrea Lodovichetti)
I'm Afraid I am Hitler (Ruchika Lalwani)
Last Tape (Sarah Frazier)
Lazarus Taxon (Denis Rovira) – (tie) Best Short
Maggots (Matt Giannini)
The Music of Erich Zann (Jared Skolnick)
No Junk Mail (Chris McHugh)
Orla's Song (Eric Deacon)
The Peach Farm  (Wendy Hoopes)
Roar (Adam Wimpenny)
Seance (Robin Kasparík)
Sinkhole (Eric Scherbarth)
Sucker (Troy Price)
The Taxidermist (Bert & Bertie) – (tie) Best Short
Thirsty (Andrew Kasch)
The Ugly File (Mark Steensland)
Void (Meredith Berg)
Werewolf Trouble (Charlie Anderson) – Best Makeup FX
Zombies & Cigarettes (Rafael Martinez and Iñaki San Roman)

Source:

2010 

The festival took place between October 21 and October 24, 2010. It received 347 submissions, of which 50 films were selected. The festival venues included the Barrington Public Library in Barrington, Jamestown Arts Center in Jamestown, and Bell Street Chapel Theatre and Veterans Memorial Auditorium in Providence, Rhode Island.

Feature competition 
Mørke Sjeler  (César Ducasse and Mathieu Peteul, /) – First Place for Best Feature
True Nature (Patrick Steele) – (tie) Best Feature
Within (Hanelle Culpepper, /)
Zombie Dearest (David Kemker) – (tie) Best Feature

Documentaries
Lizbeth: A Victorian Nightmare (Ric Rebello) – Best New England

Non–competition features
King Kong (Merian C. Cooper and Ernest B. Schoedsack, 1933)
The Fall of the House of Usher (Roger Corman, 1960)
The Pit and the Pendulum (Roger Corman, 1961)
The Raven (Roger Corman, 1963)

Shorts
The Absence (Alex DeMille)
Anglesey Road (Russell Owen)
A Pain Like This (Ian Fischer)
Beware of What You Wish For (Patricia Doyle)
Black Rose (David Ricci)
The Bloodstone Diaries: Sleeper (Gerry Bruno)
Chloe and Attie (Scooter Corkle) – U.S. Premiere 
The Continuing and Lamentable Saga of The Suicide Brothers (Arran and Corran Brownlee) – (tie) First Place for Best Short
Death Row Diet (Mike Salva and Tom Snyder)
DemiUrge Emesis (Aurelio Voltaire)
Evil of the Vampires (Mark Morris) – World premiere 
The Familiar (Kody Zimmermann)
"Halloween" Was Already Taken (Nitzan Rotschild)
The Happiness Salesman (Krishnendu Majumdar) – (tie) Best Short
The Hollow Girl (Dave McCabe)
How I Survived The Zombie Apocalypse (Christian Cantamessa)
Just Desserts (Nigel Karikari)
Leap (Dan Gaud)
Love Me Tender (Matthew Morgenthaler)
Maya (Ronald Johnson)
Meth (Michael Maney) – (tie) First Place for Best Short
Mister Green (Greg Pak)
Natural Selection (Brett Foraker) – (tie) Best Short
The Package (Oliver Waghorn)
Project Panacea (Daniel Jourdan)
Red Balloon (Damien Mace and Alexis Wajsbrot) – Directorial Discovery
Remember (Andrea Zamburlin)
Remission (Greg Ivan Smith)
Re-Wire (David-James Fernandes)
The Silver Key (Gary Fierro)
S.P.A.G.H.E.T.T.-1 (Adam Varney)
Spoiler (Ed Whitmore)
Sudden Death! (Adam Hall) 
Tell Him Next Year (David Margolis) – Best Makeup FX
The Tell Tale Heart (Lynne Cohen)
The Tell-Tale Heart, Animated Horror Short (Michael Swertfager) – Best Animation
The 3rd Letter (Grzegorz Jonkajtys)
Tinglewood (Alexander von Hofmann)
Tinkermen (Matthew Wade)
TUB (Bobby Miller)

Source:

2011 

The festival took place between October 27 and October 30, 2011. It received 383 submissions, of which 42 films were selected. The festival venues included the Barrington Public Library in Barrington, Jamestown Arts Center in Jamestown, and Bell Street Chapel Theatre and Veterans Memorial Auditorium in Providence, Rhode Island.

Feature competition 
Absentia (Mike Flanagan) – (tie) First Place for Best Feature
Beg (Kevin MacDonald) – (tie) Best Actor and Best Feature
The Corridor (Evan Kelly) – (tie) Best Feature
State of Emergency (Turner Clay) – (tie) First Place for Best Feature
The Whisperer in Darkness (Sean Branney)

Documentaries
Dracula: The Vampire and the Voivode (Michael Bayley Hughes) – Best Documentary

Non–competition features
Scream 4 (Wes Craven, 2011)

Shorts
Alistair (Aaron Cartwright)
Amok (Christoph Baumann)
An Evening With My Comatose Mother (Jonathan Martin) – Best Makeup FX
Awfully Deep – (Daniel Florencio, /)
Bad Moon Rising (Scott Hamilton)
Cabine of the Dead (Vincent Templement) – (tie) First Place for Best Short
The Curse of Yig (Paul von Stoetzel)
Dinner (Jason Shawn Alexander)
Doll Parts (Karen Lam)
Enter the Dark (Todd Miro)
Hatch (Damian McCarthy)
Hawkins Hill (Sara Seligman, /)
Hay Un Diablo  (Brant Hansen) – (tie) First Place for Best Short
Hike (Jennifer Campbell)
Impostor (Marc Masciandaro) – (tie) Best Short
Incubator (Jimmy Weber) – (tie) Best Short
I Rot (Josef J. Weber)
Kitty Kitty (Michael Medaglia)
La Migala  (Jaime Dezcallar)
Last Halloween (John Stewart Muller)
Last Seen on Dolores Street (Devi Snively) – Directorial Discovery
Le Miroir (Sébastien Rossignol)
Nice Guys Finish Last (Kimberly McCullough)
Maquinas Infernales (Simon Pernollet) – (tie) Best Sci-Fi/Fantasy
Ocho (Raul Cerezo)
Paths of Hate (Damian Nenow) – Best Animation
Patient Zero (Jacob Chase)
Payload (Stuart Willis) – (tie) Best Sci-Fi/Fantasy
Quick Shop (Martin Binder)
The Tombs (Jerry LaMothe)
Tread Darkly (Kyle Laursen)
Victim (Matthew A. Brown)
Waffle (Rafael De Leon, Jr.)
Worm (Ryan Vernava)

Source:

2012 

The festival took place between October 25 and October 28, 2012. It received 461 submissions from 20 countries, of which 63 films were selected. The festival venues included Roger Williams University in Bristol, Jamestown Arts Center in Jamestown, Fort Adams State Park in Newport, and Bell Street Chapel Theatre, Providence Public Library, and URI Feinstein Campus in Providence, Rhode Island.
 
Feature competition 
247°F (Levan Bakhia)
A Little Bit Zombie (Casey Walker)
The Barrens (Darren Lynn Bousman)
Beyond the Grave (Davi de Oliveira Pinheiro)
Exhumed (Richard Griffin) – First Place for Best Feature
The Thing on the Doorstep (Tom Gliserman) – H.P. Lovecraft Award
Towers (Jet Wintzer) – (tie) Best Feature
Twisted (Chai Yee Wei, /)
Up There (Zam Salim) – (tie) Best Feature

Documentaries
Nightmare Factory (Donna Davies) – Best Documentary

Non–competition features
From the Vault: RI Horror Film Festival Classics
Cabine of the Dead (Vincent Templement) – 2011 First Place for Best Short
Hatch (Damian McCarthy) – 2011 entry
Hay Un Diablo (Brant Hansen) – 2011 First Place for Best Short
Incubator (Jimmy Weber) – 2011 Best Short
Kitty Kitty (Michael Medaglia) – 2011 entry
Last Seen On Dolores Street (Devi Snively) – 2011 entry
Vampyre Compendium (Matteo Bernardini) – 2011 Best Actress

Shorts
Advantageous (Jennifer Phang) – Best Science Fiction
Apple! (Frank Morris)
Attack of the Brain Suckers (Sid Zanforlin)
Cadaver (Jonah D. Ansell)
Chilly (Dylan Kohler) – Filmmaker Discovery Award
Cryo (Luke Doolan)
Deathbed (Ryan Williams)
Eagle Walk (Rob Himebaugh) – Best Makeup FX
Emily (Benjamin Mathews)
Exit (Daniel S. Zimbler)
Fallout (Derek Dubois) – New England Discovery
Foxes (Lorcan Finnegan)
Franky and The Ant (Billy Hayes)
The Glow (Bryan Ott) – Best Fantasy
Good Taste (Greg Hanson) 
Grace (Chole Huber)
Gray Matter (James B. Cox)
Harmony (Pierre-Emmanuel Plassart)
Her Heart Still Beats (Christopher Di Nunzio)
The Hunter (Marieka Walsh)
La Granja (Ignacio Lasierra) – Best Short
La Réparation (Julien Boustani and Cecilia Ramos)
LIFELESS #BeingKindaDeadSortaSucks (VP Boyle)
Modern Family (Kwang Bin Kim)
Muse (Yanna Kalcheva)
The Narrative of Victor Karloch (Kevin McTurk)
Nursery Crimes (L. Whyte)
The Other Side (Oli and Alex Santoro)
Overflowed (Joan Llabata, /)
Plush (Ryan Denmark)
Quinkin (Michael Wannenmacher)
The Reluctant Vampire (Michael Greischar)
Rotting Hill (James Cunningham)
Shadow of the Unnamable (Sascha Alexander Renninger)
She's Lost Control (Haritz Zubillaga) – (tie) First Place for Best Short
Shhh (Freddy Chavez Olmos, /)
The Soul Never Sleeps (Chris Peters) – Best Experimental Film
The Stolen (Karen Lam)
Transmission (Zak Hilditch)
Trash Day (Mike Frazier)
Vadim (Peter Hengl) – (tie) First Place for Best Short
Wonderland, A True Story (Dana Al Mojil)
Worm (Bert & Bertie)

Source:

References 

Lists of films by award